is a sub-kilometre asteroid, classified as a near-Earth object of the Aten group that is potentially hazardous only as the orbit evolves over millennia. It was first observed on 21 August 2006 by the Siding Spring Survey. On 10 August 2019, the object safely passed  from Earth. With a 12 year observation arc it has a well determined orbit and is not a threat for the foreseeable future.

Discovery 
 was first observed on 21 August 2006 by the Siding Spring Survey, at the Siding Spring Observatory in Australia.

Orbit and classification 

 is classified as an Aten asteroid, which means that it is a near-Earth asteroid that crosses Earth's orbit at two points and has an orbital period of less than a year. Because it will come within 0.05 au of the Earth (MOID) and has an absolute magnitude (H) brighter than 22,  is labelled as a potentially hazardous object. With a 12 year observation arc it has a well determined orbit and is not a threat for the foreseeable future.

It orbits the Sun at a distance of 0.57–1.03 au in less than 9 months (263 days; semi-major axis of 0.80 au). Its orbit has an eccentricity of 0.28 and an inclination of 3.4° with respect to the ecliptic. The body's observation arc begins with its first observation at the Siding Spring Observatory on 21 August 2006.

Close approach in 2019 
On 10 August 2019 at 7:23 am UTC,  safely passed  from Earth; travelling at around  The asteroid was recovered on 14 July 2019, which extended the observation arc from 8 years to 12 years, and therefore it had a very small uncertainty in the 2019 approach. The uncertainty region in the close approach was ±60 km.

Physical characteristics 
Based on its absolute magnitude of 20.1,  is estimated to have a diameter of 250–570 metres using an assumed albedo between 0.05 (carbonaceous) and 0.26 (siliceous).

Notes

References

External links 
 MPEC 2009-P41 : 2006 QQ23, Minor Planet Electronic Circular
 List Of Aten Minor Planets (by designation), Minor Planet Center
 List of the Potentially Hazardous Asteroids (PHAs), Minor Planet Center
 PHA Close Approaches To The Earth, Minor Planet Center
 
 

20060821

Minor planet object articles (unnumbered)
2006